Carlos Logario was a Spanish doctor practising in England in the 16th century.

Logario was the doctor to Cardinal Wolsey, the chief minister of Henry VIII.

References

Year of birth missing
Year of death missing
16th-century Spanish physicians
16th-century Spanish people
16th-century English medical doctors